A progress indicator is an element of a command-line interface, a textual user interface, or a graphical user interface that is intended to inform the user that an operation is in progress, to reassure that the system is not hung or waiting for user input,
and often to provide the user with an estimate of how far through a task the system has progressed.

Examples of progress indicators 
 A progress bar, a typically horizontal bar which is gradually filled with a color as the process completes.
 A throbber, an image in a program's interface which animates to show that the software is busy.
 A splash screen, covering all or most of the computer screen while a program is loading.
 Turning the mouse pointer into an hourglass or a spinning pinwheel to indicate to the user that they should not click anything until the active process is complete.
 A simple textual percentage figure, common in CLI applications.

References

Further reading 
  — the Apple Human Interface Guidelines for progress indicators
  
  
  — how to create a progress indicator in the status bar of an application using MFC

User interface techniques
Graphical user interface elements